Spelobia clunipes is a species of fly belonging to the family of the lesser dung flies.

Distribution
Canada, United States, Afghanistan, Andorra, Austria, Azores, Belgium, Bulgaria, China, Czech Republic, Cyprus, Denmark, Estonia, Faeroe Islands, Finland, France, Germany, Great Britain, Hungary, Iceland, Ireland, Italy, Latvia, Lithuania, Mongolia, Netherlands, North Macedonia, Norway, Poland, Portugal, Romania, Russia, Slovakia, Slovenia, Spain, Sweden, Switzerland, Tajikistan, Tunisia, Ukraine, Uzbekistan, Montenegro, Serbia.

References

Sphaeroceridae
Muscomorph flies of Europe
Diptera of Africa
Diptera of North America
Insects described in 1830